Svinøy Lighthouse is a fully automated lighthouse situated on the island of Svinøy in the sea off the Stad peninsula. It is located in the municipality of Herøy in Møre og Romsdal county, on the western coast of Norway. The island rises  out of the sea and is exposed to severe climatic conditions year round.

History
Travel accounts from the 18th century tell that local farmers would put pigs out to pasture on the island during the summer, hence the name Svinøy; this oral tradition was confirmed by a historian in 1931, but it seems likely that goats were put on the island in the summer.

A lighthouse commission of 1851 recommended placing a lighthouse on Svinøy but found conditions too difficult to implement such plans. As an interim measure, a marker was placed on the island. The plans for a full lighthouse were realized in the following decades, and on 1 September 1905, the lighthouse was finished and lit, with further construction finished the following year.

Quarters for several families were built, but the isolated island was never a popular station.  At the peak, three families lived on the island, growing vegetable gardens and employing a tutor for their children.

During World War II, German troops were stationed at the lighthouse, and in 1940, Allied bomb raids put the light out of commission. It was repaired after the war and reopened in 1946.

By 1952, it became apparent that no crew were willing to be permanently stationed on the island. A crew of four was stationed there in a shift arrangement, and the shift arrangements eased in 1970 when helicopters were used to ferry staff and supplies between the island and the mainland. In addition to lighthouse duties, the staff also conducted meteorological measurements on an ongoing basis. At one time, goats were brought onto the island to provide a hobby for the inhabitants.

On the 100th anniversary of the original lighting of the firehouse, the island was depopulated as the light was fully automated. Although many of the original buildings have been torn down, the station still includes several buildings and can now sleep 10 in comfortable but modest circumstances.

Since 2005 the company 62 Nord has offered overnight arrangements for small groups.

Flora and fauna
Botanic surveys of the island were conducted in 1928 and 2005. The plant diversity had increased in the intervening years, possibly due to weeds being imported when inhabitants planted vegetable gardens. Wind and salt spray limit the natural vegetation to lichen (Xanthoria parietina and Ramalina cuspidata) and grasses (Armeria maritima and more).

Climate
Weather conditions have been measured since 1955, and currently the island has an automated weather station under the Norwegian Coastal Administration. The climate on the island is typically coastal, with precipitation of about  a year, somewhat less than what is typical on Norway's western coast. Precipitation measurements are complicated by high winds and sea spray.

Waves are known to wash over the entire island.

So difficult are landing conditions that the island has no piers.  There are three landing sites on different sides of the island, and on one, a crane pulls boats out of the water. A boathouse built in 1905 lasted only one year before it was claimed by the sea and rebuilt in concrete well above sea level the year after.

See also

 List of lighthouses in Norway
 Lighthouses in Norway

References

External links
 62 Nord description of the lighthouse
 Article on closure of the lighthouse by Kystverket
 100th Anniversary publication by Kystverket
 Norsk Fyrhistorisk Forening 

Lighthouses completed in 1905
Lighthouses in Møre og Romsdal
Sunnmøre
1905 establishments in Norway